Ernest Simon may refer to:
 Ernest Simon, 1st Baron Simon of Wythenshawe (1879–1960), English industrialist and politician
 Ernest Simon (footballer) (born 1980), Nigerian footballer
 Ernest Simon (fencer) (born 1952), Australian Olympic fencer
 Walter Simon (sinologist) (Ernest Julius Walter Simon, 1893–1981), Berlin-born sinologist and librarian